Hermann Aldryk Trostrup Helgesen (28 February 1889 – 1 February 1963) was a Norwegian gymnast who competed in the 1920 Summer Olympics. He was part of the Norwegian team, which won the silver medal in the gymnastics men's team, free system event.

References

1889 births
1963 deaths
Norwegian male artistic gymnasts
Gymnasts at the 1920 Summer Olympics
Olympic gymnasts of Norway
Olympic silver medalists for Norway
Olympic medalists in gymnastics
Medalists at the 1920 Summer Olympics
20th-century Norwegian people